

Geography
 Curiel de Duero, a municipality in Spain

People
As a surname, Curiel may refer to:
 Abraham Curiel (1545–1609), Portuguese physician
 Alonso Curiel, Spanish merchant and diplomat
 Augusta Curiel (1873–1937), Surinamese photographer
 Carlos Curiel (1913–unknown), Mexican Olympic diver
 César Curiel (b. 1949), Mexican professional wrestler
 David Curiel (1594–1666), Portuguese merchant and diplomat
 David T. Curiel (b. 1956), American cancer biologist
 Elias David Curiel (1871–1924), Venezuelan poet 
 Enrique Curiel (1947–2011), Spanish politician 
 Eugenio Curiel (1912–1945), Italian physicist and resistance member
 Federico Curiel (1917–1985), Mexican filmmaker
 Fernando Curiel (b. 1942), Mexican writer
 Francisco Curiel, Spanish philologist 
 Francisco Velasco Curiel (1922–1984), Mexican politician
 Freddy Curiel (b. 1974), boxer from the Dominican Republic
 Gonzalo Curiel (composer) (1904–1958), Mexican film composer
 Gonzalo P. Curiel (b. 1953), United States District Judge
 Héctor González Curiel (b. 1968), Mexican engineer and politician
 Henri Curiel (1914–1978), Egyptian activist
 Israel ben Meir di Curiel (1501–1573), rabbi at Safed, Ottoman Palestine
 Jacob Curiel (1587–1664), Portuguese merchant and diplomat 
 Jahacob Curiel (1687–1747), Dutch merchant and diplomat, lived in Amsterdam and Curaçao
 Jonathan Curiel (b. 1960), American journalist
 Juan Curiel (1690–1775), Spanish politician
 Juan Alfonso Curiel (d. 1609), Spanish professor of philosophy and theology 
 Leobardo Curiel Preciado (b. 1947), Mexican politician
 Luis Curiel (1655–1724), Spanish diplomat
 Luis del Carmen Curiel (1846–1930), Mexican general during Mexican Revolution
 Marcos Curiel (b. 1974), American guitarist
 Miguel Curiel (b. 1988), Peruvian footballer
 Morris Elias Curiel (1863–1928), Venezuelan banker
 Moses Curiel (1620–1697), Portuguese merchant and diplomat
 Ochy Curiel (b. 1963), Afro–Dominican social anthropologist and activist
 Pilar Montero Curiel (b. 1950), Mexican philologist 
 Rafael Curiel Gallegos (1883–1955), Mexican politician
 Ran Curiel (b. 1949), Israeli diplomat and former Israeli Ambassador to Greece
 Raoul Curiel (1913–2000), French archaeologist and brother of Henri
 Rogelio Flores Curiel (1924–2008), Mexican general and politician 
 Shayron Curiel (b. 1991), Curaçao–born Dutch footballer

Sometimes it is spelled Couriel or Curjel:
 Alberto Couriel (b. 1935), Uruguayan accountant and politician
 Hans Curjel (1896–1974), Swiss art historian
 Luzia Hartsuyker-Curjel (1926–2011), German–Dutch architect
 Robert Curjel (1859–1925), German–Swiss architect

Sephardic surnames